Chin National Defence Force (abbreviated CNDF) is   a Chin ethnic armed organisation in Myanmar. It is the armed wing of the Chin National Organisation (CNO), and was founded on 13 April 2021 alongside it. It is one of the armed groups formed in Chin State of Myanmar in response to the Myanmar military's coup d'état after 1 February 2021.

References 

Rebel groups in Myanmar
Paramilitary organisations based in Myanmar